"The Hills" is a song by Canadian singer the Weeknd. It was released on May 27, 2015, as the second single from his second studio album, Beauty Behind the Madness (2015). "The Hills" was a massive critical and commercial success, appearing on several year-end lists, and peaking at number one in several nations' charts, like his native Canada, or the United States where the song reached number one on the Billboard Hot 100, replacing his own "Can't Feel My Face". It also made the top 10 in the United Kingdom, Ireland, Germany, Australia, and New Zealand. A music video for the song was released on May 27, 2015, directed by Grant Singer.

In May 2019, "The Hills" was certified diamond by the Recording Industry Association of America (RIAA) for selling more than ten million copies, making it the Weeknd's first diamond-certified record.

Composition
The song is written in the key of C minor in common time with a tempo of 113 beats per minute. The vocals in the song span from C3 to E5.

Producer Illangelo stated "I'm very optimistic and positive with anything I put my energy towards, so for me, Abel's success now is what I imagined it always should have been. 'The Hills' was an opportunity for us to go back to the classical, original the Weeknd moments of our first mixtapes that I co–produced and mixed in their entirety, and then bringing that into a new context, with a pop arrangement and chords in a faster tempo. It's the perfect marriage of that". While promoting After Hours, the Weeknd claimed to have recorded 67 versions of the song.

Critical reception

"The Hills" received critical acclaim, with most reviewers praising the Weeknd's return to form after his pop-oriented direction with "Earned It". James Shotwell of Under the Gun wrote that the single fits well within Abel's prior output, but that "Abel's ability to create something altogether hypnotic regardless of production never ceases to amaze". Brian Mansfield of USA Today noted that "when a song takes its hook from a horror film—Wes Craven's 1977 cult classic The Hills Have Eyes—you know there's bound to be trouble".

In an analytical piece for Pitchfork, Hannah Giorgis called "The Hills" "a dark, almost discordant meditation on lust, drugs, and fame" while noting that "to those familiar with his repertoire, the only twist in 'The Hills' is how it ends: as the final chords fade, a woman's voice, syrupy and sedate, closes with a lullaby of sorts—not in English, but in Amharic, the primary language of Ethiopia and the Weeknd's own native tongue". She goes on to trace the song's melodic and lyrical origins to the Ethiopian diaspora. She continues, writing that "the familiarity of Tesfaye's strained vibrato makes him the inheritor of musical legacies that Abyssinia has birthed for generations..." In a review for The New York Post, Hardeep Phull wrote that "The 'Fifty Shades of Grey' fans who were turned on to [The] Weeknd (real name Abel Tesfaye) through his hit 'Earned It' are in for a shock, because he is in brilliantly sinister form on his new track". Continuing, Phull goes on to say that "When it comes to being a Don Juan with a dark side, this guy makes Christian Grey look like Ned Flanders".

Rolling Stone ranked "The Hills" at number 11 on its year-end list to find the 50 best songs of 2015. The same magazine also included "Earned It" and "Can't Feel My Face" on the same list. Billboard ranked "The Hills" at number 10 on its year-end list for 2015: "Number one hits aren't supposed to be this sonically adventurous and dark, but The Weeknd can do no wrong in 2015. There's barely a pop hook to speak of here—just a beguiling, harrowing soundscape that's impossible to forget". Time named "The Hills" the fifth-best song of 2015. The Village Voice ranked "The Hills" at number 22 on their annual year-end critic's poll; "Can't Feel My Face" was ranked at number three on the same poll.

Plagiarism allegation
On December 9, 2015, Cutting Edge Music filed a lawsuit against Tesfaye, the producers of the track, and the labels who released the song, for allegedly using the bassline from the score of the film The Machine. The complaint also alleges that a producer who worked on the piece, Emmanuel “Mano” Nickerson, sent a message to the score's composer on Twitter stating that he had sampled the composer's work and that it might appear on the next Weeknd album.  As of July 2022, the case remains unsettled.

Commercial performance
In the United States, "The Hills" entered the Billboard Hot 100 at number 20 for the chart dated June 13, 2015, and was the week's highest debut. Its debut was overwhelmingly powered by first-week digital download sales of 109,000 copies and 5.2 million domestic streams, aided by the simultaneous premiere of its music video on the single's release date. The following week, the single declined by one position but earned the largest gain in streams on the chart. It has since become the Weeknd's second number-one single in the United States on the issue dated October 3, 2015, replacing the singer's own "Can't Feel My Face", becoming the first artist since Taylor Swift to replace themselves at the top spot. "The Hills" spent six consecutive weeks at number one before being replaced by Adeles "Hello" on the issue dated of November 14, 2015. It remained in the chart's top ten for 21 consecutive weeks before finally dropping out on January 16, 2016, and also ending the Weeknd's 45-consecutive weeks in the top 10. As of June 2016, "The Hills" has sold 2,946,000 copies in the country.

In the UK, "The Hills" entered the UK Singles Chart at 51, for the week ending June 6, 2015. For the week ending September 10, 2015, it climbed from 35 to 29. For five more weeks, the song reached 23, before skyrocketing to number 5 the week later. On the week ending October 29, 2015, it reached number 3 on its 20th week, being held off by Perfect by One Direction (at number 2) and Turn the Music Louder (Rumble) by KDA (at number 1). The song spent 7 weeks altogether in the top 10 and 12 in the top 20 and was number 25 on the end of year chart.

Remixes
On October 10, 2015, two remixes of the song were released online. One featured American rapper Eminem and the other featured Trinidadian-American rapper Nicki Minaj. The remix by Minaj was performed on Saturday Night Live along with the Weeknd. The Eminem remix was a personal request from Tesfaye, and a virtual music video was released for it. American rapper Lil Wayne remixed the song for his mixtape No Ceilings 2.

On August 9, 2016, a remix was released by the Belgian DJ duo, Dimitri Vegas & Like Mike, as one of the free downloads of their "Summer of Madness" tracks. Another remix was released on Tesfaye's YouTube channel by RL Grime.

Music video
The music video for "The Hills" was directed by Grant Singer. It was uploaded to YouTube on May 27, 2015. As of April 1, 2022, the video has been viewed over 1.8 billion times. The video begins showing a wrecked car that has flipped over, and the reason it flipped is unknown. The Weeknd is seen crawling out of the car before helping two women to get out. As the song progresses, the Weeknd is seen walking by himself down South June Street in Los Angeles, and at the beginning of the second chorus, the wrecked car explodes behind him. He occasionally is pushed repeatedly by one of the women from the car. At the end of the song, he enters an abandoned mansion, and goes upstairs to a room illuminated with red light. A man holding an apple sits waiting for him, next to two other women, and the video cuts to black.

The man from inside the mansion is Rick Wilder, who also appears in both the "Can't Feel My Face" and "Tell Your Friends" music videos.

Another music video was filmed for the Eminem remix in collaboration with GoPro and United Realities. It is a 360-degree virtual reality video in which the Weeknd is seen leaving a venue and heading to his limo (taking him to the afterparty featured in an Apple Music commercial, with John Travolta as his driver). As the viewer changes the angles, it is shown that comets are raining down and the raining debris causing fiery explosions around the area. The car that's flipped over in the original music video is also in view. As he approaches his limousine, a fiery explosion consumes him.

Popular culture
The song was featured in season 1, episode 21 of Life in Pieces.
Yves Saint Laurent's featured the song in a commercial to advertise  Black Opium perfume, featuring Zoe Kravitz.
The song is available in Rock Band 4 as downloadable content.

Track listing
 Digital download
 "The Hills" – 3:55

 Digital download – remixes
 "The Hills" (featuring Eminem) – 4:23
 "The Hills" (featuring Nicki Minaj) – 4:02

 Digital download – remixes
 "The Hills" (RL Grime Remix) – 4:31
 "The Hills" (Dimitri Vegas & Like Mike Remix) – 5:55

Charts

Weekly charts

Year-end charts

Decade-end charts

All-time charts

Certifications

References

2015 songs
2015 singles
The Weeknd songs
Billboard Hot 100 number-one singles
Canadian Hot 100 number-one singles
Songs written by the Weeknd
Songs written by Belly (rapper)
Songs written by Illangelo
Songs written by Nicki Minaj
Song recordings produced by Illangelo
Republic Records singles
XO (record label) singles
Songs about drugs
Songs involved in plagiarism controversies
Trap music songs
Nicki Minaj songs
Eminem songs
Songs written by Eminem
Industrial songs
Canadian electronic songs